Kue bolu or simply Bolu is an Indonesian term to describes a wide variety of sponge cakes, tarts and cupcakes.

Kue bolu might be steamed or baked. There are wide variety of kue bolu, and most of the texture is soft and fluffy akin to sponge cake or chiffon cake.

Ingredients
The ingredients for kue bolu may includes wheat flour, rice flour, sugar, milk, coconut milk, egg, and butter or margarine. Flavourings might include vanilla, chocolate or pandan.

Kue bolu is known for its soft and fluffy texture, contributed from the foaming effect of bubbles created by leavening agent that lightens and softens the dough mixture. Traditionally kue bolu uses yeast as leavening agent, today however, baking powder or baking soda is more commonly used.

Today in Indonesia, bolu is mostly refer to a bare sponge cake without any frosting. Cakes that coated in frosting is called keik (derived from English "cake") instead.

Etymology and history
Hundred years of colonisation in Indonesian archipelago has left its legacy in local culinary tradition. European influences upon Indonesian cuisine is most prevalent in baking, pastry, cake and bread making technique, introduced by Portuguese and Dutch colonials. The term bolu in Indonesian is derived from Portuguese bolo to describe cake, or more precisely sponge cake. This loanword describe the historic Portuguese influence in Indonesia.

After the Dutch take over, the Dutch word taart was also entered Indonesian vocabulary, as a  similar kind of kue snack or cake, thus today the term bolu and tar or tart is used interchangeably to describe cakes or tarts.

Variations

In Indonesian cuisine bolu is categorized under kue, which includes wide variety of traditional snacks, cakes, and sweets. Kue bolu or simply bolu is often used as an umbrella term to identify wide varieties of cakes and tarts in Indonesia. Variations include:

Bolu bahari Small bolu cupcake of Kalimantan (Indonesian Borneo).
Bolu bruder Lit:brother's cake, Manado (Minahasan) soft bolu sponge cake. In Manado Malay the term bruder means Christian priest, which derived from brother in Christianity. Spelling variations include brudel or bluder.
Bolu emprit Small bite-sized bolu of Javanese cuisine tradition, prevalent in Yogyakarta.
Bolu gulung Rolled bolu akin to Swiss roll.
Bolu klemben A variant of dry bolu from Banyuwangi, East Java. The shape is elliptical resembles a small sized football or akin to cocoa pod. It is quite similar to kue bahulu.
Bolu kukus Steamed bolu cupcake, a popular jajan pasar (market buys) in Indonesian traditional market.
Bolu macan or bolu marmer Tiger stripes or marbled bolu cakes, made by creating stripe pattern using chocolate.
Bolu lapis mandarin Two layered square bolu cake, usually plain and chocolate.
Bolu pandan Green coloured pandan flavoured bolu sponge cake.
Bolu pisang Banana flavoured bolu cake.
Bolu tape keju Bolu cake enrichen with tape fermented cassava and cheese.
Kue bahulu or Bolu keringSmall bite-sized bolu cake of Malay cuisine, more prevalent in Malay Peninsula, Sumatra and Borneo.

Gallery

See also

Cuisine of Indonesia
Lapis legit
Kue
Kue mangkok
Roti buaya
Roti gambang

References

External links
 Collection of kue bolu recipes

Kue
Steamed foods